Events in the year 2017 in Botswana.

Incumbents
 President: Ian Khama 
 Vice President: Mokgweetsi Masisi

Events
3 April – An earthquake of magnitude 6.5 occurred in the Central District of Botswana.

In September 2017, the Botswana High Court ruled that the refusal of the Registrar of National Registration to change a transgender man's gender marker was "unreasonable and violated his constitutional rights to dignity, privacy, freedom of expression, equal protection of the law, freedom from discrimination and freedom from inhumane and degrading treatment". LGBT activists celebrated the ruling, describing it as a great victory. At first, the Botswana Government announced it would appeal the ruling, but decided against it in December, supplying the trans man with a new identity document that reflects his gender identity.

A similar case, where a transgender woman sought to change her gender marker to female, was heard in December 2017. The High Court ruled that the Government must recognise her gender identity. She dedicated her victory to "every single trans diverse person in Botswana".

Deaths

28 April – Gofaone Tiro, footballer.
29 April – Herbert Nkabiti, boxer (b. 1981).

22 June – Quett Masire, politician (b. 1925)

References

 
2010s in Botswana
Years of the 21st century in Botswana
Botswana
Botswana